Saintfield is a civil parish in County Down, Northern Ireland. It is situated in the historic barony of Castlereagh Upper.

Settlements
The civil parish contains the village of Saintfield.

Townlands
The civil parish contains the following townlands:

Ballyagherty
Ballyknockan
Ballymacaramery
Bresagh
Carsonstown
Craignasasonagh
Creevyloughgare
Drumaconnell East
Drumaconnell West
Drumalig
Glasdrumman
Killinure
Leggygowan
Lessans
Lisdalgan
Lisdoonan
Lisnasallagh
Lisowen
Ouley
Saintfield Parks
Tonaghmore
Tullywasnacunagh

See also
List of civil parishes of County Down

References